Rum-running in Windsor, Ontario, Canada, was a major activity in the early part of the 20th century. In 1916, the State of Michigan, in the United States, banned the sale of alcohol, three years before prohibition became the national law in 1919. From that point forward, the City of Windsor, Ontario was a major site for alcohol smuggling and gang activity.

The Canadian federal government regulated the manufacturing, importation, and exportation of alcoholic beverages in all the provinces. When the Wartime Prohibition Act, which prohibited the manufacturing, sale, or consumption of alcoholic beverages expired on January 1, 1920, new legislation authorized each province to decide whether to continue the enforced bans on alcohol. Like most provinces in Canada, Ontario chose to continue to ban the production and sale of alcohol. This decision led to an upswing in organized crime activity along the Detroit-Windsor borders.

The Eighteenth Amendment, Volstead Act and near beer 
On January 16, 1919, the American Government passed the Eighteenth Amendment to the United States Constitution. It had three sections:

Congressman Andrew John Volstead was one of the main promoters of the Eighteenth Amendment. The Volstead Act of 1920 defined intoxicating liquor as any liquor containing more than 0.5% alcohol. It permitted the manufacture of non-intoxicating cider and fruit juices for home use, as well as permitting households to ferment wine for private consumption; and it allowed the sale of alcoholic beverages for medicinal, sacramental, and industrial purposes. The Volstead Act allowed breweries to produce "near beer" with an alcohol content of up to 0.5%. To make the near beer, distilleries produced beer and then let it sit to allow most of its alcoholic content to evaporate. This allowed breweries to produce virtually unlimited amounts of beer. Even though Ontario had their own prohibition, called the Ontario Temperance Act, which lasted from 1916 through 1927, it was still legal to manufacture and export alcohol. This loophole led to a great deal of alcohol smuggling via the Detroit River between Windsor and Detroit, the largest U.S. city on the Canada–U.S. border.

"Joe sent me" 
The popular saying, "Joe sent me", was used to gain entry to speakeasies, blind pigs, clubs or joints. By 1928, there were from 16,000 to 25,000 speakeasies and clubs in the Windsor-Detroit area, located in slums as well as in some of Detroit's most prestigious neighborhoods.  Popular drinks of the time varied depending on the club, distinguishing one club from another. Criminal gangs either owned the clubs or protected from police and other gangs.

Some clubs and speakeasies offered food, at times for free with the purchase of a beverage to encourage customers during prohibition. Police were often bribed to protect against raids, however, they would intervene if a club was prone to violence or cases of food poisoning.

The lure of speakeasies during prohibition is not difficult to understand.  Gambling played a significant role — slot machines, poker, blackjack, and roulette were popular in higher-class blind pigs — giving clubs a social and economic benefit.  The commonly accepted attitude and minimal penalties for drinking were not much of a deterrent. The thrill of violating prohibition laws appealed to the young, who were rarely embarrassed to have their names in the paper. Blind pigs generally went unnoticed, although those near churches and schools were often targeted. Drinking on campuses was usually concentrated among sororities and fraternities. The Volstead Act allowed people to obtain liquor for "medicinal purposes" by a physician's prescription, this often was then diluted and sold for huge profits.

Many Americans came to Windsor to enjoy a good time while drinking.  There were several places for Americans to drink and party simply by crossing the Detroit River, including roadhouses. One of the most popular was the Island View Hotel, off the shore of the Detroit River with its own dock. Today, Island View Hotel known as Abars, is closed and the building was torn down.

Drys vs. Wets 
The term "Drys" referred to those who were in favor of prohibition, who were generally well-financed and organized, and included figures such as Billy Sunday, organized civic groups, some religious denominations, and many leaders of the Progressive movement which also supported social causes such as women's suffrage. Supporters of prohibition argued that it helped the American family, churches, schools, workers, and the American political system. The losers, in this view, were seen as criminals, drunks and corrupt politicians.

The "Wets" were those who opposed prohibition and were, for the most part, poorly organized, especially in the early years. Saloon keepers, brewers, and distillers were viewed as corrupting influences, and many people who enjoyed consuming alcohol in private were constrained from doing so, or supporting its legal use, by social, political, or religious considerations in public.

The entrance of the United States into World War I provided opportunities to win broader support for prohibition. Rationing was widely accepted as a necessary ingredient of the American war effort. The use of grain for alcohol production, which could otherwise have been used in the production of necessary agricultural products, was seen as wasteful.

Notes

References and further reading 
 Davis, Mark C. (1985). "Atlantic Canada's Rum Running Tradition." Acadiensis 14 (2): 147–56.
 Gervais, C. H. (Marty). (1980) The Rumrunners: A Prohibition Scrapbook. Thornhill, Ont: Firefly Books. pages 51–63.
 Mason, Philip P. (1995). Rumrunning and the Roaring Twenties: Prohibition on the Michigan-Ontario Waterway. Detroit: Wayne State University Press. 
 Rennie, Gary. (9 September 2010). "'Grand Bend' visions for Belle River; Councillor sees tourism possibilities." The Windsor Star, A5.
 Spence, B. H. (1923). "Prohibitory Legislation in Canada," Annals of the American Academy of Political and Social Science, 109: 230–64.

Prohibition in Canada
Alcohol in Ontario
Crimes in Michigan
Crime in Ontario
Prohibition in the United States
Smuggling routes
History of Windsor, Ontario
History of Detroit
Canada–United States border
Canada–United States relations
1920s in Ontario
1920s in Michigan
Smuggling in the United States